Greshamton is a ghost town in Rawlins County, Kansas, United States.

History
Greshamton was issued a post office in 1883. The post office was moved to Beardsley in 1889.

References

Further reading

External links
 Rawlins County maps: Current, Historic, KDOT

Former populated places in Rawlins County, Kansas
Former populated places in Kansas
1883 establishments in Kansas
Populated places established in 1883